Hans Kutscher (14 December 1911 – 24 August 1993) was a member of the first and second Senates of the German Federal Constitutional Court and later a member and then President of the European Court of Justice.

Early life 
Kutscher was elected by the Bundesrat to serve on the Federal Constitutional Court. He served as a member of the first senate from 12 October 1955 to 31 August 1956, when this Senate was dissolved because the number of judges was reduced from twelve to ten. He was re-elected a member of the second senate from 1 September 1956, and re-elected in 1963, serving until 31 August 1971.

He joined the European Court of Justice in 1970, serving as its fifth President between 1976 and 1980.

See also
List of members of the European Court of Justice

External links
European Court of Justice Official site

1911 births
1993 deaths
Grand Crosses 1st class of the Order of Merit of the Federal Republic of Germany
Justices of the Federal Constitutional Court
Presidents of the European Court of Justice
20th-century German lawyers
German judges of international courts and tribunals